Prince Amyn Muhammad Aga Khan (born 12 September 1937) is the younger brother of Aga Khan IV, Imam of the Nizari Isma'ili sect of Shia Islam. He is the son of Prince Aly Khan and Princess Tajuddawlah Aga Khan (née Joan Yarde-Buller).

Early life and education
Prince Amyn was born on 12 September 1937 in Geneva. Like his elder brother, he attended the Institut Le Rosey and Harvard College. He graduated from Harvard in 1960 with an A.B. magna cum laude in literature and economics. He further pursued graduate studies in comparative literature at Harvard, receiving an A.M. in comparative literature in 1963 whilst also studying at the New England Conservatory. During his studies he was additionally engaged as a graduate instructor in French.

Professional and charitable activities
After completing his graduate studies he worked at the United Nations Secretariat for the Department of Economic and Social Affairs from 1964 until 1968, after which time he took on leadership roles in a variety of Ismaili institutions. On 7 December 1974 he was invested as Chief Scout of the Ismaili Scouts Association in a ceremony in Karachi. As of 2006, he was chairman of the executive committee of the Aga Khan Fund for Economic Development (AKFED) and of Tourism Promotion Services Ltd., parent company of the Serena Hotels chain and chairman of the Board of the Directors of the Aga Khan Museum. In December 2015, he was accredited as the Personal Representative of the Aga Khan to Bangladesh.

He has variously been a member of the Acquisitions Committee of the Louvre Museum, Chairman of the Friends of the Domaine de Chantilly, a trustee of the World Monuments Fund, and a director of the Silk Road Project. Prince Amyn Aga Khan, brother of the spiritual leader of the Ismailis, who recently donated to Porto the painting "Presentation of the Virgin in the Temple", now guarded at the Soares dos Reis National Museum received the Medal of Honour of Porto City in a ceremony that took place on 9 July 2019. Prince Amyn Aga Khan was awarded the city's Medal of Honour by the Mayor of the Porto Municipality, Rui Moreira who presided over a ceremony at the Casa do Roseiral, in the Gardens of the Palacio de Cristal. The medal was presented in honour of "a great patron of the arts."

References

Notes

Living people
1937 births
New England Conservatory alumni
Harvard College alumni
.
British Ismailis
Noorani family
Qajar dynasty
Alumni of Institut Le Rosey
Harvard University alumni
British people of Iranian descent
British people of Italian descent
British people of Pakistani descent
British people of Indian descent
British expatriates in Switzerland
People from Geneva
20th-century Muslim scholars of Islam
21st-century Muslim scholars of Islam
People associated with the Louvre